Kadam may refer to:

Kadam (clan), an Indian clan
Kadam (Tibetan Buddhism), a school of Buddhism
Kadam People, an ethnic group in Uganda
Kadam Rao Padam Rao, the earliest available manuscript in Dakhini masnavi
Kadam River, a minor tributary of Godavari located in the Adilabad District of Telangana
Kadam virus of the Flavivirus genus
Mount Kadam, in the Karamoja region of Uganda
Neolamarckia cadamba, a tree commonly called Kadam
Kadam, one of the Egyptian units of measurement
Kadam, temple priests in Tulja Bhavani Temple, Maharashtra, India

See also
 Kedam (disambiguation)